Percy Dwight Siverd (March 6, 1889 – February 14, 1974) was an American tennis player. He was the 1911 U.S. Men's Clay Court finalist and Pennsylvania champion in 1912.

Biography
He was born on March 6, 1889, in Pittsburgh, Pennsylvania. He died on February 14, 1974, in Cleveland, Ohio.

References

1889 births
1974 deaths
American male tennis players
Tennis players from Pittsburgh